Norman Manuel Abramson (April 1, 1932 – December 1, 2020) was an American engineer and computer scientist, most known for developing the ALOHAnet system for wireless computer communication.

Early life
Abramson was born on April 1, 1932 in Boston, Massachusetts, to immigrant Jewish parents Edward and Esther. His father was born in Lithuania, and worked in commercial photography. His mother was born in Ukraine, and managed the house.

He was schooled in the Boston public schools and attended Boston Latin School and the English High School of Boston. He showed good aptitude in math and science, and he received an A.B. in physics from Harvard University (1953),  an M.A. in Physics from UCLA (1955), and a Ph.D. in electrical engineering from Stanford University (1958). His thesis at Stanford focused on the area of communication theory.

Career
Abramson was a research engineer at the Hughes Aircraft Company until 1955, when he joined the faculty at Stanford University (1955–65), was visiting professor at University of California at Berkeley (1966), before moving to University of Hawaii (1968–94), serving as professor of both Electrical Engineering and Computer Science. Some of his early research concerned radar signal characteristics and sampling theory, as well as frequency modulation and digital communication channels, error correcting codes, pattern recognition and machine learning and computing for seismic analysis.

One of Abramson's first projects at the University of Hawaii was to develop radio technology to help the school send and receive data from its remote geographic location to the continental United States, funded by the Advanced Research Projects Agency. A key innovation in the technology was to divide the data in packets which could be resent if the data was lost during transmission, allowing for random access rather than sequential access, based on the same principles being developed for ARPAnet, the precursor of the modern Internet. The resulting radio network technology his team developed was deployed as ALOHAnet in 1971, based on the dual-meaning of the Hawaiian word "aloha". ALOHAnet became the foundation of modern wireless communication as well as influencing the development of Ethernet-based communications.

Abramson continued to serve as a professor at Hawaii until 1994 when he retired. Abramson went on to co-found Aloha Networks in San Francisco, where he served as a CTO.

Personal life and death
Abramson had two children with his wife, Joan: a son, Mark, and a daughter, Cairn; she predeceased him by six years.

Abramson died on December 1, 2020 in his San Francisco home due to complications from skin cancer that had metastasized to his lungs.

Awards
1972: IEEE Sixth Region Achievement Award  for contributions to Information Theory and Coding.
1980: IEEE Fellow Award for development of the ALOHA-System.
1992: Pacific Telecommunications Council 20th Anniversary Award for leadership in the PTC.
1995: IEEE Koji Kobayashi Computers and Communications Award for development of the ALOHA System.
1998: Golden Jubilee Award for Technological Innovation from the IEEE Information Theory Society, for "the invention of the first random-access communication protocol".
2000: Technology Award from the German Eduard Rhein Foundation.
2007: IEEE Alexander Graham Bell Medal.
2011: C&C Prize.

Publications
Information theory and coding (McGraw-Hill, 1963)
Computer communication networks (Prentice-Hall, 1973).  Editor with Franklin F. Kuo

References

External links
 Engineering and Technology History Wiki
Biography from IEEE
 Oral history interview with Severo Ornstein, Charles Babbage Institute, University of Minnesota.  Ornstein discusses the computing contributions of Wesley Clark and Norman Abramson.

 Author profile in the database zbMATH

1932 births
2020 deaths
American electrical engineers
American information theorists
Jewish American scientists
Harvard College alumni
University of California, Los Angeles alumni
University of Hawaiʻi faculty
Stanford University School of Engineering alumni
Writers from Boston
Fellow Members of the IEEE
Mathematicians from Massachusetts
American chief technology officers
Deaths from skin cancer
Deaths from cancer in California